The  is a railway line in Kumamoto Prefecture, Japan, connecting Hitoyoshi-Onsen Station in Hitoyoshi and Yunomae Station in Yunomae. It is the only railway line operated by the third sector . As the company name suggests, the line parallels the Kuma River. The company is also called . The company took over the former JR Kyushu line in 1989.

History
The entire line was opened by the then Japanese Government Railways in 1924.

Freight services ceased beyond Taragi in 1974, and completely in 1980.

The third sector company took over the former JNR line in 1989.

On 6 July 2020, all services were suspended until further notice, due to severe damage caused by the rainfall, including the complete destruction of a large bridge over the Kuma River. In May 2021, it was officially announced that the line would be restored as a railway. Restoration work is estimated to cost around 4.6 billion yen, with the national government paying 97.5% of it, with the remaining 2.5% being paid by local governments.

Kumagawa Railway announced on 9 November 2021 the planned resumption of services starting from 28 November 2021 between Yunomae Station and Higo-Nishinomura Station. Trial runs will be conducted between 19–21 November, and training runs will be conducted between 22–27 November. Services resumed between Yunomae Station and Higo-Nishinomura Station on 28 November 2021.

Basic data
Distance: 24.8 km / 15.4 mi.
Gauge: 
Stations: 14
Double-track line: None
Electric supply: Not electrified
Railway signalling
Hitoyoshi-Onsen – Asagiri: Tablet token
Asagiri – Yunomae: Staff token
Stations with passing loops: 1 (Asagiri Station)

Stations

Financial situation
The company's railway operations have not produced an operating profit since its creation in 1989, and in fiscal 2011, it had operating profit losses of 120.76 million yen.

Rolling stock
As of June 2012, the company operates a fleet of eight diesel cars. With the exception of two tourist trains, these were scheduled to be replaced by five new diesel cars between fiscal 2013 and 2014. The new trains were designed by industrial designer Eiji Mitooka. The new trains are now in service.

All five diesel cars were inundated at Hitoyoshi Onsen Station during torrential rains on 4 July 2020.

See also
 List of railway companies in Japan
 List of railway lines in Japan

References
This article incorporates material from the corresponding article in the Japanese Wikipedia

External links 
  

Railway lines in Japan
Rail transport in Kumamoto Prefecture
1067 mm gauge railways in Japan
Japanese third-sector railway lines